Guaicaipuro is one of the 21 municipalities (municipios) that makes up the Venezuelan state of Miranda and, according to a 2007 population estimate by the National Institute of Statistics of Venezuela, the municipality has a population of 280,687.  The town of Los Teques is the municipal seat of the Guaicaipuro Municipality. The municipality is named for the sixteenth century cacique Guaicaipuro.

History
The city of Los Teques was founded in 1777 and was named after the Aractoeques Carabs, an indigenous tribe that once inhabited the area.  On February 13, 1927, the capital of Miranda was moved to this city from Petare (before being in Petare, the capital of Miranda was in Ocumare del Tuy).

Geography
Temperature: Varies from 18 and 26 degrees Celsius.

Demographics
The Guaicaipuro Municipality, according to a 2007 population estimate by the National Institute of Statistics of Venezuela, has a population of 280,687 (up from 240,731 in 2000). This amounts to 9.8% of the state's population.

Government
The mayor of the Guaicaipuro Municipality is Francisco Garcés, elected on December 8, 2013, with 52% of the vote. The municipality is divided into seven parishes; Los Teques, Altagracia de La Montaña, Cecilio Acosta, El Jarillo, Paracotos, San Pedro, and Tácata.

Transportation
On November 3, 2006, President Hugo Chávez inaugurated the Los Teques Metro.  This metro system is connected to the Caracas Metro.

References

Municipalities of Miranda (state)